Bora is a Korean feminine given name. Unlike most Korean given names, which are composed of two single-syllable Sino-Korean morphemes each written with one hanja, Bora is an indigenous Korean name: a single two-syllable word meaning "purple". It is one of a number of such native names, along with others such as Ha-neul, ("sky"), Seul-ki ("wisdom"), and Sora ("conch shell"), that have become more popular in South Korea in recent decades. In some cases, however, parents also choose to register hanja to represent the name, picking them solely for their pronunciation (for example, with hanja meaning "jewel" and "net", respectively). There are 18 hanja with the reading "bo" and 14 hanja with the reading "ra" on the South Korean government's official list of hanja which may used in given names.

People with this given name include:
Geum Bo-ra (born Son Mi-ja, 1961), South Korean actress
Bora Yoon (born 1980), American experimental musician of Korean descent
Hwang Bo-ra (born 1983), South Korean actress
Lee Bo-ra (born 1986), South Korean speed skater
Jin Bora (born 1987), South Korean jazz pianist
Sunday (singer) (born Jin Bora, 1987), South Korean singer, member of The Grace
Shin Bora (born 1987), South Korean comedian
Nam Bo-ra (born 1989), South Korean actress
Yoon Bora (born 1989), South Korean singer, former member of Sistar
Hana (singer) (born Shin Bora, 1993), South Korean singer and actress, former member of Gugudan
Kim Bo-ra (born 1995), South Korean actress

See also
List of Korean given names

References

Korean feminine given names